Strawberry Crest High School is a public high school in East Hillsborough County, Florida. It opened on August 25, 2009 with students from Armwood High School, Durant High School and Plant City High School. It was built to relieve the over-population of the students in these high schools. Along with Steinbrenner High School, it is the most recently constructed high school in Hillsborough County. Strawberry Crest is the 4th high school in Hillsborough County to be certified as an International Baccalaureate high school. A number of the instructors for the IB courses come from the International Baccalaureate Program at the older C. Leon King High School, in Tampa.

Christie Raburn, former Assistant Principal for Curriculum, is the current principal. Former principal, David Brown, left the school in 2019 to move to the district's newest high school in 10 years.

The school is located at the intersection of Gallagher Road and 92 in Dover, Florida, on land that was once the family farm of longtime school board member Joe E. Newsome.  although dressed in the school colors which are red, black, and silver. The school was named Strawberry Crest in order to honor the strawberry growers of the region. Strawberrry Crest is one of only three high schools whose students are eligible to become queen of the Florida Strawberry Festival, along with Durant, Plant City, and Hillsborough Community College.

References

High schools in Hillsborough County, Florida
Public high schools in Florida
2009 establishments in Florida
Educational institutions established in 2009